The 2004 Asian Tour was the inaugural season of the modern Asian Tour, the main men's professional golf tour in Asia excluding Japan. It marked the first season in which the Asian Tour had separated from the Asian PGA.

Schedule
The following table lists official events during the 2004 season.

Order of Merit
The Order of Merit was based on prize money won during the season, calculated in U.S. dollars.

Awards

Notes

References

External links
The Asian Tour's official English language site

Asian Tour
Asian Tour